Border Patrol is a 1943 Western film directed by Lesley Selander and written by Clarence E. Mulford and Michael Wilson. The film stars William Boyd, Andy Clyde, Robert Mitchum, Jay Kirby, George Reeves, and Duncan Renaldo. The film was released on April 2, 1943, by United Artists.

Plot
Hopalong and his sidekicks are Texas Rangers who set out to find how 25 Mexicans have disappeared after being hired by the "Silver Bullets" mine. They ride into town and find that the mine owner is a one-man government, played by Russell Simpson as "Orestes Krebes." Hopalong and his friends are arrested on trumped-up charges and are tried before a kangaroo court and sentenced to swing but not until after lunch. With the help of the girl, they escape, free the captive mine workers and together defeat the evil gang.

Cast
William Boyd as Hopalong Cassidy
Andy Clyde	as California Carlson
Jay Kirby as Johnny
Russell Simpson as Orestes Krebs
Claudia Drake as Inez La Barca
George Reeves as Don Enrique Perez
Duncan Renaldo as Commandant
Pierce Lyden as Loren
Robert Mitchum as Quinn (feature film debut, though released after other later films)
Cliff Parkinson as Barton

References

External links
 
 
 
 

1943 films
1943 Western (genre) films
1940s English-language films
American black-and-white films
United Artists films
Films directed by Lesley Selander
American Western (genre) films
Hopalong Cassidy films
Films with screenplays by Michael Wilson (writer)
1940s American films